Derek Steinbacher is an American cosmetic plastic, rhinoplasty, and maxillofacial surgeon who is Professor of Plastic Surgery at Yale New Haven Health in Connecticut. He is also the chief of the Dental Department and Oral and Maxillofacial Surgery at Yale New Haven Health. He is known for his clinical work, research and incorporation of 3D analysis and printing into jaw surgery, craniofacial surgery and rhinoplasty.

Career
Steinbacher's field of work and research interests includes tissue engineering and regeneration, fat grafting, distraction osteogenesis, stress shielding, and 3-dimensional analysis and planning. He uses a 'surgery-first' approach in his orthognathic surgeries where he does the jaw surgery before much orthodontia to achieve a good outcome for his patients in aesthetic and functionality.

He also holds a CAQ in pediatric craniomaxillofacial surgery. He treats children with facial differences like cleft lip and palate, skull abnormalities (craniosynostosis), small or disproportioned jaws, and TMJ ankyloses (fusions).

Steinbacher is a fellow of the American College of Surgeons, Royal College of Surgeons of Edinburgh and the Academy of Facial Plastic Surgeons. He is actively involved in national and international organizations including the American Society for Aesthetic Plastic Surgery and Rhinoplasty Society.

Selected bibliography

\

References

Living people
Yale University faculty
University of Pennsylvania alumni
Harvard Medical School alumni
American plastic surgeons
Fellows of the American College of Surgeons
Fellows of the Royal College of Surgeons of Edinburgh
Year of birth missing (living people)